Valerie Domínguez Tarud (born January 12, 1981) is a Colombian actress, model, designer and beauty pageant titleholder who represented her country at Miss Universe 2006 where she finished in the Top 10.

Early life
She also studied fashion design in Milan, Italy and is a jewelry designer in Colombia.

Pageantry
Dominguez competed at Miss Colombia 2005 where she won and gained the right to represent Colombia at and competed at Miss Universe 2006 in Los Angeles. Domínguez finished in the Top 10.

Career
Valerie is also widely recognized thanks to her television appearances, and made her debut as Marianne Sajir in "Hasta que la plata nos separe".  She also started to enter the Colombian film industry, in the role of Manuela for the film "Esto huele mal" by Jorge Ali Triana.   It was fairly easy in Colombia for the participation of the beautiful actress. She's now in the television drama El Último Matrimonio Feliz. 
Valerie has a jewelry store in Barranquilla, which exhibits her designs. She will soon open another store in Bogotá.

Telenovelas
After participating in the Miss Universe she entered the world of television with the co-starring role in the Colombian telenovela "El último matrimonio feliz" (" The last happy marriage ") and had a supporting role in the telenovela "Hasta que la plata nos separe"(" Until the money do us part "), both on RCN television.   Besides this, she had her first film appearance Manuela performing the role in the movie called "Esto huele mal" by Jorge Alí Triana.

Then she starred in the series produced by Sony "Los caballeros las prefieren brutas" which was produced for cable television  latinooamérica where she plays the character of Cristina. The series is based on the book with the same title Isabella Santo Domingo . She is currently starring in a telenovela produced by FOX RCN Telecolombia called Un sueño llamado salsa (A dream called salsa).

Dominguez is also known for acting in Beyond Brotherhood (2017) and Do You Believe? (2015).

Personal life
Valerie is first cousins with singer Shakira and is of Lebanese descent.

References

External links
Miss Universe 2006: Colombia
Official Myspace Page

External links
 Miss Colombia

Living people
1981 births
People from Barranquilla
Colombian beauty pageant winners
Miss Universe 2006 contestants
Colombian people of Lebanese descent
Miss Colombia winners